The KG Group is a South Korean chaebol established in 2003 and operating, through its affiliates, in various industries and other businesses (including chemicals, steel, services, and media). The main affiliates of the KG Group are KG Chemical (its core company) and KG Steel.

The KG Group expanded through mergers and acquisitions.

History
In 1985, Kwak Jae-sun and other investors founded Seil, a power plant company. In 2003, Kwak sold his Seil stake and used the money obtained to acquire a company under receivership, Gyeonggi Chemical (later renamed KG Chemical), initially a fertilizer producer which diversified through merging, and established the KG Group chaebol.

In the following years, the KG Group expanded through a mergers and acquisitions strategy. In 2005, it acquired the cogeneration company Sihwa Energy (later renamed to KG Energy and then KG ETS), and in 2008, it purchased the delivery company Yellow Cap (KG Yellow Cap). In 2010, it acquired waste treatment company Eco Service Korea (name changed to KG ETS after being merged with KG Energy in 2011), the fund evaluation company Zeroin ( KG Zeroin), and the media company Edaily. 

In 2011, the KG Group acquired the e-commerce company Inicis (renamed KG Inicis) and electronic payment provider Mobilians (KG Mobilians). In 2013, it acquired Eduone (renamed KG Eduone). In 2014, it acquired Dongbu and Dongbu Parcel merged with KG Yellow Cap, the combination renamed KG Logis, but sold it in 2017. In 2016, KG Inicis took a 60% stake in Samsung Allat from Samsung C&T Corporation and Samsung Card (later changed its name to KG Allat and merged with KG Mobilians in 2019) and the South Korean KFC franchise in 2017. 

In May 2019, the KG Group established a special purpose corporation (SPC), KG Steel, by investing funds from group affiliates (such as KG Chemical and KG ETS), in order to take a 40% controlling stake in Dongbu Steel. It formed a consortium with Cactus Private Equity, a South Korean private equity fund, to finish the transaction.

In October 2020, KG Inicis, through a SPC called Crown F&B, acquired a 93.8% stake in Hollys F&B (the operator of the Hollys Coffee coffeehouse franchise) from IMM Private Equity, a private equity fund manager.

In June 2022, the KG Mobility consortium (KG ETS, KG Mobilians, KG Steel, Cactus Private Equity, KG Inicis, and Pavilion Private Equity), a KG Group affiliate, was selected as the final bidder for South Korean car manufacturer SsangYong Motor. In August 2022, South Korea's Free Trade Commission approved KG Group acquisition of a 61% controlling stake in receivership-bound SsangYong. The acquisition payments were completed later that month. In September 2021, the Seoul Bankruptcy Court agreed to SsangYong's receivership exit plan, including issuing new shares in order to pay the creditors. The KG Group is set to start the process to exit SsangYong's receivership in early October and finish the acquisition process on or before 14 October, the SsangYong sale deadline. 
There also are plans to rename SsangYong.

Corporate

Structure

As other chaebol, the KG Group is not a single company controlling others but rather a loose grouping of companies (affiliates) that is linked through a complex, circular cross ownership structure. The structure is centred around three companies: KG Chemical (the core company of the group and  parent), KG Zeroin (the largest KG Chemical shareholder, majority controlled by the Kwak family) and KG (a holding company). The two main affiliates of the KG Group by business volume are KG Chemical and KG Steel. The KG Group affiliates are set up to work autonomously and are called "family" instead of affiliate internally. , the number of afffiliates was 21 domestic and 8 overseas.

Branding
According to Kwak, the KG Group name is an initialism for "Korea Green". 

The KG Group has two logos, often used in conjunction: a wordmark with "KG"  in sans-serif script and a purple, violet, orange, and yellow logo simbolising a prism. The official font for the KG Group is Avenir. The slogan is "think great" with the k and g letters stilised in uppercase.

Main affiliates

KG Chemical

Gyeonggi Chemical (the previous name of KG Chemical) was established in 1954 and its main product was chemical fertilizers. By 2000, it was the largest in the domestic fertilizer market. The company was listed on the South Korean stock market in 1989. 

Following the 1997 Asian financial crisis, Gyeonggi Chemical sold off its affiliates (Gyeonggi Mining and Daljae General Trading Corporation) but it did not make a major restructuring to improve its financial situation. The company declared bankruptcy in 1999. In 2002, the Mitsubishi Group, with which Gyeonggi Chemical had a partnership, formed a consortium and tried to take over, but it failed. The company was acquired by Kwak in 2003 and adopted its current name. In 2017, it acquired Enerchem, which produces high-purity nickel sulfate, a raw material for rechargeable battery cathode active materials. 

The company's first base (plant and headquarters) was in Bucheon. In 1982, it built a second plant at Onsan (a port in Ulsan). The Bucheon facilities were sold off in 2013 and the company moved its headquarters to Onsan.

KG Steel

KG Steel Co., Ltd. is a producer of steel-related products.

References

Chaebol
Conglomerate companies established in 2003